The Infinite Sea is a young adult science fiction novel written by American author Rick Yancey. It was published on September 16, 2014, by G. P. Putnam's Sons. The novel is the second in The 5th Wave trilogy, preceded by The 5th Wave and followed by The Last Star. After fleeing from a camp established by aliens, 16-year-old Cassie Sullivan, her brother and a squad of child soldiers attempt to prevent the extermination of the human race.

The novel provides detailed histories of the secondary characters from the previous novel. Instead of just narration from Cassie, the narration shifts from the point of view of another teenage girl called Ringer.

Plot

A few weeks after the events of the first novel, Cassie, Ben, and the rest of Squad 53 have taken refuge at a hotel, which they call "Walker Hotel" in honor of Evan Walker, who is thought to be dead after destroying Camp Haven. Ringer, believing that their refuge in the hotel will not last, goes out searching for a cave system mentioned in a brochure. Teacup, whom she had grown close to, sneaks up on Ringer and who proceeds to shoot her, having mistaken Teacup for a Silencer. A helicopter flies in and they are both captured by The Others. While Cassie and the others anxiously await Ringer, they realize that Teacup has gone missing, and Dumbo and Poundcake set out to find her but return empty-handed.

Evan Walker is revealed to have survived Camp Haven's destruction and is wounded. He is rescued by Grace, a fellow Silencer, and both head to her makeshift home. After one of Grace's hunts, she tries to seduce Evan, but he attacks her. As he escapes, Grace shoots at him but lets him go, knowing that he will lead her to Cassie. While he rests, Grace finds and confronts him. They are attacked by child soldiers from Camp Haven and Grace is shot at, giving Evan the opportunity to escape.

Evan finds their hotel, and disarms Ben in a misunderstanding, though Ben stabs his leg. Evan finds Sammy and, seeing the gun in his hands, dives at him. Cassie shoots him once and he is rendered unconscious. Ben angrily waits for him to awaken. Cassie defends him while Ben throws constant insults toward him. In the midst of this, they hear a helicopter approach; however, it quickly flies off. Then, they see a small girl walking down the hallway, whom Sammy identifies as "Megan". Megan says that her throat hurts before passing out.

The group cares for her, though when Evan awakes, he warns them not to, explaining that The Others planted a bomb in her throat rigged to detonate on high concentrations of carbon dioxide. The group moves outside, a distance from the hotel, while Cassie and Evan stay behind to remove the bomb from her throat. With a struggle, Cassie manages to safely remove the bomb and she contains it in a plastic baggie. Ben and Poundcake have been collecting  canisters so that the bomb can be detonated at a safe distance away.

Grace appears as Cassie and Evan finish the operation. She forcefully kisses Evan in front of Cassie. The squad arrives and chaos ensues: Poundcake is shot, and the helicopter flies in during the struggle, and Grace appears to destroy the helicopter and kill the pilot. While this is happening, Evan tells Cassie of a pod sent down from the mothership to extract Grace that will be her temporary home. He shows her how to find it and shows her the bomb they removed from Megan's throat. Sammy takes the bomb as he rushes by on his way out. Evan makes Cassie promise "to end it" and insists that he be left behind. As she knows she has no other choice, Cassie kisses him and leaves.

A short distance from the hotel Sammy turns and starts running back, Cassie catches him and Sammy says that he dropped the bomb. Unable to carry him, the group leaves a mortally wounded Poundcake and continues to move away from the hotel. Poundcake crawls back to the hotel, finds the lost explosive device, and blows it up an arm's length away from Grace, demolishing the hotel and killing both of them. Cassie thinks Evan had died in the explosion.

Ringer is taken to another "training" camp, much like Camp Haven, with Colonel Vosch having taken over command of the camp. Ringer semi-befriends a recruit named Razor, who knows of the conspiracy and that the officials at camp are actually The Others. Ringer asks Vosch about the whereabouts of Teacup and Vosch tells her that she is alive. Vosch, Razor, and a woman named Claire enhance her with the 12th system (neural chip and nanobots), a piece of Other technology designed to strengthen human anatomy.

Ringer and Razor conspire to escape. The plan is carried out successfully, Ringer kills Claire and disables Jumbo, knocks out Teacup, and forces a pilot to fly them in a helicopter. Before it crashes, the pilot, Razor, and Teacup bail out. Ringer jumps without a parachute and lands in an ice-covered lake. After meeting at the crash site, Ringer soon discovers that Razor was secretly working with Vosch. She had sensed something through the 12th system when she kissed him prior to the jump from the helicopter. She knocks him out and heads to the warehouse, which had been converted to a hospital at the time of the 3rd Wave. She finds Vosch in it, who openly invites her to a fight, wins easily, and reveals that Silencers are not actually "Others". They are just humans enhanced by the 12th system neural chip that contains a constructing program to make them believe they are "Others", never controlled or linked to the "Others". It is unclear if Vosch is human. Razor is charged with guarding and helping to heal Ringer; eventually, they reconcile.

When they return to base, Vosch questions Ringer about what the "solution" is. She states that the "Others" don't mean to exterminate all humans. Vosch states that the "Others" could have simply eliminated all humans by dropping a big rock on them and hints there is a specific goal to be gained through the wave attacks. Vosch tells Ringer he has enhanced her to hunt down and kill Walker, and that he needs someone like her because the destroyed drones were meant to track the enhanced humans, not normal humans. Razor whispers to Ringer about the leverage Vosch has on her because of Teacup and proceeds to shoot and kill Teacup. In return, Razor is shot and dies. The chaos gives Ringer a chance to escape by diving out a window.

In the end, Cassie and squad 53 are recovering from the explosion. From the woods, Evan emerges and Cassie goes to meet him.

References

External links

 

2014 science fiction novels
2014 American novels
Alien invasions in novels
American science fiction novels
American young adult novels
Children's science fiction novels
Novels about extraterrestrial life
The 5th Wave
G. P. Putnam's Sons books